Picea aurantiaca is a species of conifer in the pine family, Pinaceae. It is endemic to China, where it is only known from western Sichuan. Its common name is orange spruce.

This tree grows on steep mountain slopes on the edges of forests. It grows in a cold subalpine climate up to about 3800 to 4000 meters in maximum elevation. It can be found alongside Picea likiangensis var. rubescens, Abies squamata, Larix potaninii, and birches.

This species is closely related to Picea asperata and it is sometimes treated as a variety.

References

aurantiaca
Endangered plants
Endemic flora of China
Taxonomy articles created by Polbot